The Magic Carpet is a 1951 American adventure film directed by Lew Landers and written by David Mathews. The film, shot in SuperCinecolor, stars Lucille Ball, John Agar, Patricia Medina, George Tobias, Raymond Burr, Gregory Gaye, Rick Vallin and Gary Klein. It was released on October 18, 1951 by Columbia Pictures, three days after Ball's I Love Lucy premiered.

Plot
Omar, a caliph, and Yazmina, a queen, arrange their infant son Ramoth's escape when rival Ali moves to forcibly overthrow them. Before they are slain, they ensure that the baby, his locket and magic carpet are kept in the safe hands of Ahkmid, an uncle and physician who raises Ramoth to manhood.

Ramoth, unaware that he is the rightful heir but disapproving of Ali's tyranny, disguises himself as the Scarlet Falcon and, assisted by his friend Razi and Razi's beautiful sister Lida, attempts to disrupt the caliph's reign. The evil Boreg becomes his nemesis, as does Narah, a princess who is the sister of Ali.

Ahkmid, mortally wounded by Boreg, reveals his true identity to Ramoth. Lida endeavors to infiltrate Ali's forces by disguising herself as a dancer, but she is caught and imprisoned. Ramoth is also taken prisoner, but Lida escapes and sends the magic carpet to rescue Ramoth in the nick of time. Ali is killed and Narah is placed in a dungeon as Ramoth and Lida fly away on the carpet to begin a new life.

Cast
 Lucille Ball as Princess Narah
 John Agar as Abdullah al Husan / Dr. Ramoth / The Scarlet Falcon
 Patricia Medina as Lida
 George Tobias as Razi
 Raymond Burr as Grand Vizier Boreg al Buzzar
 Gregory Gaye as Caliph Ali
 Rick Vallin as Abdul
 Jo Gilbert as Maras
 Gary Klein as Baby

Reception
In his two-star review, Leonard Maltin described The Magic Carpet as a "[m]ild costumer that has virtue of Ball as heroine, and little else," although Patricia Medina portrays the actual heroine in the film.

References

External links 
 

1951 films
American adventure films
1951 adventure films
Columbia Pictures films
Films directed by Lew Landers
Cinecolor films
1950s English-language films
1950s American films